17α-Hydroxyprogesterone (17α-OHP), also known as 17-OH progesterone (17-OHP), or hydroxyprogesterone (OHP), is an endogenous progestogen steroid hormone related to progesterone. It is also a chemical intermediate in the biosynthesis of many other endogenous steroids, including androgens, estrogens, glucocorticoids, and mineralocorticoids, as well as neurosteroids.

Biological activity
17α-OHP is an agonist of the progesterone receptor (PR) similarly to progesterone, albeit weakly in comparison. In addition, it is an antagonist of the mineralocorticoid receptor (MR) as well as a partial agonist of the glucocorticoid receptor (GR), albeit with very low potency (EC50 >100-fold less relative to cortisol) at the latter site, also similarly to progesterone.

Biochemistry

Biosynthesis
17α-OHP is derived from progesterone via 17α-hydroxylase (encoded by CYP17A1)

17α-OHP increases in the third trimester of pregnancy primarily due to fetal adrenal production.

This steroid is primarily produced in the adrenal glands and to some degree in the gonads, specifically the corpus luteum of the ovary. Normal levels are 3-90 ng/dl in children, and in women, 20-100 ng/dl prior to ovulation, and 100-500 ng/dl during the luteal phase.

Measurement
Measurements of levels of 17α-OHP are useful in the evaluation of patients with suspected congenital adrenal hyperplasia as the typical enzymes that are defective, namely 21-hydroxylase and 11β-hydroxylase, lead to a build-up of 17α-OHP. In contrast, the rare patient with 17α-hydroxylase deficiency will have very low or undetectable levels of 17α-OHP. 17α-OHP levels can also be used to measure contribution of progestational activity of the corpus luteum during pregnancy as progesterone but note, 17α-OHP is also contributed by the placenta.

Immunoassays like RIA (radioimmunoassay) or IRMA (immunoradiometric
assay) used to clinically determine 17α-OHP are prone to cross-reactivity with the 17α-OHP steroid precursors and their sulphated conjugates. Gas or liquid chromatography and mass spectrometry (e.g. LC-MS/MS) achieves greater specificity than immunoassays.

Measurement of 17α-OHP by LC-MS/MS improves newborn screening for congenital adrenal hyperplasia due to 21-hydroxylase deficiency, because 17α-OHP steroid precursors and their sulphated conjugates which are present in the first two days after birth and longer in pre-term neonates, cross-react in immunoassays with 17α-OHP, giving falsely high 17α-OHP levels.

Pharmacology

Pharmacokinetics
Although 17α-OHP has not been used as a medication, its pharmacokinetics have been studied and reviewed.

Medical uses

Esters of 17α-OHP, such as hydroxyprogesterone caproate and, to a far lesser extent, hydroxyprogesterone acetate and hydroxyprogesterone heptanoate, have been used in medicine as progestins. When "hydroxyprogesterone" is referenced from the standpoint of medical use, what is usually being referred to is actually, in general, hydroxyprogesterone caproate.

Chemistry

17α-OHP, also known as 17α-hydroxypregn-4-ene-3,20-dione, is a naturally occurring pregnane steroid. It features ketone groups at the C3 and C20 positions, a hydroxyl group at the C17α position, and a double bond between the C4 and C5 positions.

17α-OHP is the parent compound of a class of progestins referred to as the 17α-hydroxyprogesterone derivatives. Among others, this class of drugs includes chlormadinone acetate, cyproterone acetate, hydroxyprogesterone caproate, medroxyprogesterone acetate, and megestrol acetate.

Society and culture

Generic names

See also
 11α-Hydroxyprogesterone
 5α-Dihydroprogesterone
 20-Dihydroprogesterone
 11-Deoxycorticosterone
 11-Deoxycortisol
 17α-Methylprogesterone
 19-Norprogesterone
 19-Nortestosterone

References

Antimineralocorticoids
Diketones
Glucocorticoids
Pregnane X receptor agonists
Pregnanes
Progestogens